Yushuzhuang station is a station on Line 16 of the Beijing Subway.

Station Layout 
The station has 2 underground side platforms. There are 4 exits, lettered A, B, C and D. Exits B and D are accessible via elevators.

References 

Beijing Subway stations in Fengtai District